Mykyta Dudka (born 18 December 2000) is a professional Ukrainian football midfielder who plays on loan for FC Kremin Kremenchuk from FC Oleksandriya.

Career 
Born in Kremenchuk, Dudka is a product of the Kremin Kremenchuk youth sportive school in his native city.

He played for Vorskla Poltava and after that for FC Oleksandriya in the Ukrainian Premier League Reserves competition. Dudka made his debut in the Ukrainian Premier League for Oleksandriya on 18 October 2020, playing as a start squad player in a winning home match against FC Inhulets Petrove and scored one goal.

References

External links 
Statistics at UAF website (Ukr)

2000 births
Living people
People from Kremenchuk
Ukrainian footballers
FC Kremin Kremenchuk players
FC Oleksandriya players
Ukrainian Premier League players
Association football midfielders
Sportspeople from Poltava Oblast
21st-century Ukrainian people